is a Japanese footballer currently playing as a forward for FC Kariya.

Club career

Early career and move to Europe
After graduating from junior high school, Koga embarked on a career which took him first to English Premier League side Leicester City. Having failed to establish himself in the club's youth ranks, he moved to the Netherlands, signing with PEC Zwolle, where he stayed for two years. However, as he was unable to receive a work permit in the Netherlands, he left the club in 2017. He went on to trial with Belgian side Cercle Brugge and French side Troyes, before joining Royale Union Saint-Gilloise in February 2018.

Return to Japan
Koga first returned to Japan in early 2019, going on trial with Yokohama F. Marinos. This trial proved to be unsuccessful, and after a spell back in Europe with Latvian side FK Auda, he signed for J2 League side Renofa Yamaguchi in February 2020. Having only made one appearance for Renofa Yamaguchi, he dropped down to the Japan Football League with FC Kariya for the 2021 season.

After a short spell in Australia with Caroline Springs, Koga signed for J3 League side YSCC Yokohama for the 2022 season.

Career statistics

Club
.

Notes

References

External links

1998 births
Living people
Association football people from Tokyo
Japanese footballers
Association football forwards
J2 League players
J3 League players
Japan Football League players
Tokyo Verdy players
Leicester City F.C. players
PEC Zwolle players
Royale Union Saint-Gilloise players
FK Auda players
Renofa Yamaguchi FC players
FC Kariya players
Caroline Springs George Cross FC players
YSCC Yokohama players
Japanese expatriate footballers
Japanese expatriate sportspeople in England
Expatriate footballers in England
Japanese expatriate sportspeople in the Netherlands
Expatriate footballers in the Netherlands
Japanese expatriate sportspeople in Belgium
Expatriate footballers in Belgium
Japanese expatriate sportspeople in Latvia
Expatriate footballers in Latvia
Japanese expatriate sportspeople in Australia
Expatriate soccer players in Australia